Siemens Milltronics Process Instruments Inc. (SMPI) designs and manufactures level measurement tools for use in mining, food, chemical processing, oil & gas, water & wastewater, cement, and dry bulk storage.

SMPI was founded on June 21, 1954 as Milltronics Ltd. by Dave Weston  and was later acquired by Siemens in 2000. Its breakthrough was in the late 1970s when it pioneered ultrasonic level measurement.  In 1984 Milltronics became the first manufacturer of microprocessor-based ultrasonics instruments with the AiRanger IV.

Its later brands include the popular "MultiRanger" and "The Probe" for monitoring and/or control of liquids and solids in process and storage vessels. These brands have transitioned or been replaced by the SITRANS L line of level products. Brands in the dynamic weighing product line included the "CompuScale", "BW500", and "MSI" belt scale. The weighing brands are now under the "Milltronics" brand.

References

Siemens